Harald Udo von Riedl (born 1936) is an Austrian botanist and mycologist. A species in the Borrage family, Heliotropium riedlii, is named in his honour. His published work is as "Harald Riedl".

Abbreviation

References

Austrian mycologists
1936 births
Living people
Place of birth missing (living people)
Date of birth missing (living people)